Mike Ndlangamandla (born 8 July 1990), is a South African actor and model who was in the television series Muvhango and Durban Gen.

Personal life
Ndlangamandla was born on 8 July 1990 in Piet Retief, Mpumalanga province, South Africa.

Career
Before entering drama, he joined a casting agency. In the meantime, he studied drama at the DNA academy at Johannesburg Theatre. In 2018, he played the supportive role of "Pastor Max" on SABC 2 Venda drama serial Muvhango. Then in 2019, he appeared in the etv sci-fi telenovela Isipho and played the role "Teboho". In 2020, he joined with the regular cast of the e.tv. medical telenovela Durban Gen. In the series, he plays the lead role of "Dr. Lindelani Zulu".

References

1990 births
Living people
South African male television actors